Don't Stop Movin' is a U.S.-only compilation album from S Club. The album contains a combination of tracks from Sunshine and Seeing Double (six from the former, eight from the latter). It was released in December 2002. It failed to chart or produce any hit singles, following the top 10 success of "Never Had a Dream Come True". This was to be the group's final release in the U.S.

Track listing

References

S Club 7 albums
2002 albums